Ksenia Olegovna Antonova (born 21 August 1990) is a Russian former ice dancer. With partner Roman Mylnikov, she won two bronze medals on the ISU Junior Grand Prix series.

In March 2007, Antonova teamed up with German ice dancer Paul Boll but the partnership did not last.

Competitive highlights
(with Mylnikov)

References

 2005 JGP Andorra
 2006 JGP Netherlands

External links

 
 Ksenia Antonova / Roman Mylnikov at Tracings.net

1990 births
Living people
Russian female ice dancers